Kunów Lake is small lake in Lubartów County in Poland near Lake Firlej.

Lakes of Poland
Lakes of Lublin Voivodeship